Clifford Wendell Walwyn (born 22 May 1964) is a former West Indian cricketer. Walwyn was a right-handed batsman who bowled right-arm off break. He was born at Brown Hill, Nevis.

Walwyn made his first-class debut for the Leeward Islands against Barbados in the 1993/94 Red Stripe Bowl. He made six further first-class appearances for the team, the last of which came against Jamaica in the 1994/95 Red Stripe Bowl. In his seven first-class matches, he scored 300 runs at an average of 27.27, with two half centuries and a high score of 80, which came against Trinidad and Tobago at Sturge Park in the 1993/94 Red Stripe Bowl. He also played List A cricket for the Leeward Islands, making his debut in that format against Barbados in the 1993/94 Geddes Grant Shield. He made five further List A appearances for the team, the last of which came against Barbados in the final of the same tournament, which the Leeward Islands won. In six List A appearances, he scored 91 runs at an average of 18.20, with a high score of 32.

In February 2006, Walwyn played for the United States Virgin Islands in the 2006 Stanford 20/20, whose matches held official Twenty20 status. He made two appearances in the tournament, in a preliminary round victory against St Maarten and in a first-round defeat against St Vincent and the Grenadines. He later played for the United States Virgin Islands in their second appearance in the Stanford 20/20 in 2008, making two appearances in a preliminary round victory against St Kitts and in a first-round defeat against Antigua and Barbuda. In his four appearances, he scored a total of 68 runs at an average of 17.00 and a high score of 40.

References

External links
Clifford Walwyn at ESPNcricinfo
Clifford Walwyn at CricketArchive

1964 births
Living people
Leeward Islands cricketers
United States Virgin Islands cricketers
Saint Kitts and Nevis emigrants to the United States Virgin Islands
Nevisian cricketers